James Albert Missouri (May 29, 1917 – July 4, 1989) was an American Negro league pitcher between 1937 and 1940.

A native of Bishopville, South Carolina, Missouri made his Negro leagues debut in 1937 with the Philadelphia Stars. He went on to play for the Stars for three more seasons through 1940. Missouri died in Capitol Heights, Maryland in 1989 at age 72.

References

External links
 and Seamheads

1917 births
1989 deaths
Philadelphia Stars players
Baseball pitchers
Baseball players from South Carolina
People from Bishopville, South Carolina
20th-century African-American sportspeople